George Colborne Lemmon (born 20 March 1932) was the seventh Bishop of Fredericton.

After an earlier career as a Linotype operator he studied for a Bachelor of Arts (BA) at the University of New Brunswick. He was ordained in 1963  and began his career at Canterbury, New Brunswick. He later held incumbencies at Wilmot, Renforth, Sackville and Christ Church, Fredericton.

References

1932 births
University of New Brunswick alumni
Anglican bishops of Fredericton
20th-century Anglican Church of Canada bishops
Living people